Nelson Township may refer to:

 Nelson Township, Clay County, Arkansas, in Clay County, Arkansas
 Nelson Township, Lee County, Illinois
 Nelson Township, Cloud County, Kansas
 Nelson Township, Michigan
 Nelson Township, Watonwan County, Minnesota
 Nelson Township, Barnes County, North Dakota
 Nelson Township, Portage County, Ohio
 Nelson Township, Pennsylvania

Township name disambiguation pages